Luca Milesi (born 28 April 1993) is an Italian professional footballer who plays for Serie C club AlbinoLeffe.

Club career
Born in San Giovanni Bianco in the Bergamo Province, Luca began his career on hometown's club Atalanto, entering in the youth categories and later he played on Primavera club.
On 28 August 2013 he was loaned to Lega Pro club Benevento.

On 8 September 2014 he made his first match as a professional, starting in a 1–1 draw against Grosseto at the Stadio Olimpico Carlo Zecchini, for the Lega Pro championship.

On 29 August 2019, he signed a two-year contract with Piacenza. In May 2020, after a two-months break of Italian Serie C due to the COVID-19 pandemic, he decided to leave the club following the decision of his team-mate Antonio Pergreffi.

On 16 September 2020 he returned to Modena. On 14 January 2021, he was loaned to Carrarese.

On 12 August 2021, Milesi signed with Siena in Serie C. He made his debut on the first matchday of the domestic league on 29 August in a 3–0 win over Vis Pesaro. On 1 November, he scored his first goal for the club, securing a 2–1 win in the 90th minute of the match against Gubbio.

On 31 January 2022, Milesi moved to AlbinoLeffe.

References

External links
 
 

1993 births
Living people
Italian footballers
Footballers from Bergamo
Association football defenders
Atalanta B.C. players
Benevento Calcio players
F.C. Pro Vercelli 1892 players
S.S. Arezzo players
Modena F.C. players
L.R. Vicenza players
Piacenza Calcio 1919 players
Carrarese Calcio players
A.C.N. Siena 1904 players
U.C. AlbinoLeffe players
Serie B players
Serie C players